Kim Kintziger (born 2 April 1987) is a Luxembourgian football player, who currently plays for FC Mondercange in the Luxembourg 1. Division.

Club career
Kintziger started his career at Swift Hesperange and joined Differdange in summer 2007.

International career
He made his debut for Luxembourg in an October 2005 World Cup qualification match against Estonia and by November 2009 had earned 33 caps, scoring 1 goal. He played in 10 FIFA World Cup qualification matches and 10 Uefa European Cup qualification matches.
He scored his first international goal in a friendly against Iceland on the 14-11-2009. The game finished 1:1.

References

External links
 
 

1987 births
Living people
Luxembourgian footballers
FC Swift Hesperange players
FC Differdange 03 players
Luxembourg international footballers
Association football defenders